Achilles Gray (7 January 1864 – 2 July 1954) was an Australian politician.

He was born in Wedderburn to American-born grazier Joshua Rogers Gray and Eliza Ferguson Donald. He worked on the family property, but also worked as a veterinary surgeon. Around 1884 he married Sarah Crisp, with whom he had four daughters and one son called Meleager Gray. 

He served on Korong Shire Council from 1901 to 1946, and was president five times (1908–1910, 1912–1913, 1925–1926, 1934–1935, 1940–1941). In 1914 he was elected to the Victorian Legislative Assembly as the Liberal member for Korong. He was defeated after a single term in 1917. Gray died in Inglewood in 1954.

References

1864 births
1954 deaths
Nationalist Party of Australia members of the Parliament of Victoria
Members of the Victorian Legislative Assembly